Nidda or Niddah could refer to:

Niddah, a concept in Judaism, name for any woman during menstruation, or a woman who has menstruated and not yet completed the associated requirement of immersion in a mikveh (ritual bath)
Niddah (Talmud), a tractate in the Mishna and Talmud, on the Halakha of Niddah in the order of Mishnah Tohorot.
Nidda, Hesse, a town in Germany
Nidda (river), a river in Germany
County of Nidda, a state of the Holy Roman Empire from 1104-1450

See also

Nedda, given name